John Charles Eklund Jr. (born in Cheyenne, Wyoming) is an American politician and a Republican member of the Wyoming House of Representatives representing District 10 since January 11, 2011.

Education
Eklund earned his BS from the University of Wyoming.

Elections
2020 Eklund won in a four-way fight between him, Jennifer Burns, Lars Lone and Donn L. Edmunds in the August 18, 2020 Republican Primary with 1,330 votes (54.2%). In the November 3, 2020 General Election, Eklund was unopposed, winning with 5,565 votes.
2018 Eklund was challenged for the third time by Donn L. Edmunds in the August 21, 2018 Republican Primary and defeated him with 1,808 votes (76.4%). He was challenged by Jenefer Pasqua in the November 6, 2018 General Election and won with 3,332 votes (79.9%).
2016 Eklund defeated Donn L. Edmunds in the August 16, 2016 Republican Primary and won with 1,375 votes (77.7%). In the November 8, 2016 General Election, Eklund defeated Democrat Matthew Porras with 2,282 votes (74.7%).
2014 Eklund defeated Anthony Bouchard and Donn L. Edmunds in the August 19, 2014 Republican Primary, winning with 1,186 votes (59.4%). In the November 4, 2014 General Election, Eklund was running against Gaylan Wright, Sr. from the Democratic Party and won with 2,282 votes (74.7%). 
2012 Eklund won the August 21, 2012 Republican Primary with 1,326 votes (71.5%), and was unopposed for the November 6, 2012 General election, winning with 3,844 votes.
2010 When Democratic Representative Rodney Anderson retired and left the District 10 seat open, Eklund won the August 17, 2010 Republican Primary with 1,484 votes (61.5%), and won the November 2, 2010 General election with 3,119 votes (67.7%) against Democratic nominee Gary Roadifer, who had sought the seat in 2008.

References

External links
Official page at the Wyoming Legislature
 

Year of birth missing (living people)
Living people
Republican Party members of the Wyoming House of Representatives
Politicians from Cheyenne, Wyoming
University of Wyoming alumni
21st-century American politicians